Ring the Alarm is the second and final album by Philly's Most Wanted (shortened to Philly's Most), released on June 15, 2004 through Universal Records. By the time this album was released, the duo's partnership with production team The Neptunes, who had produced most of their last album, had ended, and The Neptunes did not produce any songs on Ring the Alarm. Instead, production was handled by various producers.

The album was poorly promoted and only reached 70 on the Billboard Top R&B/Hip-Hop Albums. The album's only single, also titled "Ring the Alarm", did not reach the Billboard charts. After the album ran its course, Philly's Most Wanted disbanded with no further releases.

Track listing
"Intro" - 2:45
"Away from Here" - 4:25 (featuring Black Thought)
"Ring the Alarm" - 3:46
"Most Wanted Shit" - 3:57
"Old Head" - 0:22
"Dust Ya Boots" - 3:50
"So Much Trouble" - 3:30
"Pimp in Distress" - 1:53
"My Baby" - 3:38 (featuring Ryan Toby)
"Memory Lane" - 3:38
"Point a Chick Out" - 4:18 (featuring Marsha Ambrosius)
"Clutch Shooters" - 3:34

Charts

References

2004 albums
Hip hop albums by American artists
Universal Records albums